M. J. R. L. "Marcel" de Graaff (born 7 April 1962) is a Dutch politician. He has been a Member of the European Parliament (MEP) for the Netherlands since February 2020, and previously served between 2014 and 2019. He represented the Party for Freedom (PVV) and was co-president of the Europe of Nations and Freedom. De Graaff was a member of the Senate of the Netherlands for the PVV from 2011 to 2014.

Early life and career 
Marcel de Graaff was born on 7 April 1962 in Rotterdam. De Graaff studied theology at the Radboud University Nijmegen between 1981 and 1988.

De Graaff worked as a consultant for IT & Operations from 1 August 1989. He was a teacher of religion at a secondary school in Rotterdam from 1 January 2010 until 1 July 2010. He also was a manager for KPN telecommunications company.

Political career 
De Graaff was a member of the Senate of the Netherlands representing the Party for Freedom from 7 June 2011 until 1 July 2014. He was parliamentary group leader of the PVV in the Senate from 25 September 2012 until 10 June 2014.

De Graaff was the top candidate of the PVV for the 2014 European Parliament elections. He became Member of the European Parliament for the Netherlands per 1 July 2014. He has also become the parliamentary group leader of the PVV in the European Parliament since the beginning of his term as an MEP.

In 2015, far-right MEPs founded the Europe of Nations and Freedom group. Marine Le Pen and De Graaff have been its first co-presidents since 15 June 2015. On 28 October 2015, De Graaff voted multiple times for Le Pen in her absence, which is against the European Parliament's rules. Parliament president Martin Schulz withheld € 1,530 in allowances as a punitive measure.

De Graaff was the PVV leader for the 2019 European Parliament election. The party did not obtain any seats in the election. His term in the European Parliament ended on 1 July 2019. In February 2020 it was announced that because of Brexit the PVV would obtain a seat in the European Parliament, which was assigned to De Graaff. He was appointed per 1 February 2020.

In 2022, he defected to Thierry Baudet's Forum for Democracy (FvD) party after expressing support for its more hardline stance against the COVID-19 vaccine and criticising the PVV's pro-vaccine policies.

On 2 March 2022, he was one of 13 MEPs who voted against condemning the Russian invasion of Ukraine.

On 15 September 2022, he was one of 16 MEPs who voted against condemning President Daniel Ortega of Nicaragua for human rights violations, in particular the arrest of Bishop Rolando Álvarez. 

On 22 October 2022, he left Identity and Democracy group and announced his decision to become a Non-Inscrit member of European Parliament due to group's opposition of his stance on Russia. Beforehand. his membership in Identity and Democracy was suspended.

Personal life 
De Graaff is a Roman Catholic and lives in Rotterdam. He is married to fellow politician Gabriëlle Popken.

References

External links
 Marcel de Graaff at the website of the European Parliament
  Marcel de Graaff at the website of the European Parliament delegation of the Party for Freedom

1962 births
Dutch anti-vaccination activists
Dutch educators
Dutch management consultants
Dutch Roman Catholics
Party for Freedom MEPs
Forum for Democracy MEPs
Living people
Members of the Senate (Netherlands)
MEPs for the Netherlands 2014–2019
MEPs for the Netherlands 2019–2024
Party for Freedom politicians
Politicians from Rotterdam
Radboud University Nijmegen alumni